Pseudoviridae is a family of viruses, which includes three genera.

Viruses of the family are actually LTR retrotransposons of the Ty1-copia family. They replicate via structures called virus-like particles (VLPs). VLPs are not infectious like normal virions, but they nevertheless make up an essential part of the pseudoviral lifecycle.

Taxonomy
Pseudoviridae is unofficially classified under group VI RNA Reverse Transcribing Viruses and infect fungi and invertebrates.

Pseudoviridae comprises highly divergent members and most Pseudoviridae encode Gag and Pol on a single open reading frame.

Pseudoviridae is included in the order Ortervirales along with families Belpaoviridae, Metaviridae, Retroviridae, and Caulimoviridae.

The family includes the following genera:
 Hemivirus
 Pseudovirus
 Sirevirus

Further Pseudoviridae species not classified into a genus are:
 Penicillium camemberti virus - GP1 
 Phaseolus vulgaris Tpv2-6 virus

Genome

The genome of viruses from this family is unsegmented, -RT, positive-sense, single-stranded RNA and is 4200–9700 nucleotides long. The genome encodes structural proteins and non-structural proteins which codes for an RNA-dependent DNA polymerase, replicase, and reverse transcriptase for the reverse transcription step during replication.

Virology
The viral capsid is unenveloped and looks roughly spherical. The capsid is round with icosahedral symmetry with triangulation number (T) = 3 and 4. It is also isometric to quasi-isometric and has a diameter of 30-50 nm. LTR-retrotransposons are poorly characterized and lipids have not reported.

The genome integrates into the host genome and gets transcribed by host cell enzymes such as eukaryotic nuclear RNA polymerase II. Genome replication takes place in the host cytoplasm, or the nucleus and assembly can occur in the cytoplasm, or in the nucleus.

References

External links 
ICTV Report: Pseudoviridae
NCBI ICTVdb
Pseudoviridae (Darwin Zoology)

RNA reverse-transcribing viruses
Virus families
Ortervirales